Ceryx guttulosa is a moth of the subfamily Arctiinae. It was described by Francis Walker in 1864. It is found in Aru, the Key Islands and in Australia (Queensland: Cape York), Malaysia and Thailand.

References

Ceryx (moth)
Moths described in 1864